Montluçon Communauté is the communauté d'agglomération, an intercommunal structure, centred on the town of Montluçon. It is located in the Allier department, in the Auvergne-Rhône-Alpes region, central France. Created in 2017, its seat is in Montluçon. Its area is 377.8 km2. Its population was 60,617 in 2019, of which 34,361 in Montluçon proper.

Communal territory

Composition 
The communauté d'agglomération consists of the following 21 communes:

Arpheuilles-Saint-Priest
Désertines
Domérat
Lamaids
Lavault-Sainte-Anne
Lignerolles
Marcillat-en-Combraille
Mazirat
Montluçon
La Petite-Marche
Prémilhat
Quinssaines
Ronnet
Sainte-Thérence
Saint-Fargeol
Saint-Genest
Saint-Marcel-en-Marcillat
Saint-Victor
Teillet-Argenty
Terjat
Villebret

Demographics

See also 

 List of intercommunalities of the Allier department

References

Montlucon
Montlucon